Hans Hottinger was a Swiss rower. He rowed for Basler RC. He was European champion in the double scull event with his partner Helmut von Bidder in 1930, 1931, and 1934. They were Swiss champions several time.

References

Year of birth missing
Year of death missing
Swiss male rowers
Sportspeople from Basel-Stadt
European Rowing Championships medalists
20th-century Swiss people